L'heure mauve is the twelfth studio album by Canadian singer-songwriter Pierre Lapointe, released on February 7, 2022, through Pépiphonie and Bonsound. It was made to soundtrack Swiss artist Nicolas Party's exhibition L'heure mauve at the Montreal Museum of Fine Arts (MMFA), which will be held from February 12 to October 16, 2022. Among the 14 tracks, Lapointe covered songs by Félix Leclerc and Kurt Weill. The album will be released on vinyl in mid-2022.

Background
Lapointe was approached by the Montreal Museum of Fine Arts to compose the album, with Lapointe stating that he admires Nicolas Party's art. He intended to explore themes of "the ephemerality of existence, loving mourning and carnal desire" and "create an enveloping and dreamlike universe, which echoes the themes and the structure" of the exhibition. Each of the tracks soundtracks a different room of Party's exhibit, with visitors encouraged to plug in their headphones in each room.

The cover art is Party's Portrait avec serpents (2019).

Track listing

References

2022 albums
Bonsound albums
Pierre Lapointe albums